Laveno-Mombello Lago is a railway station in Italy. It is the end of the Saronno–Laveno railway.

It serves the town of Laveno-Mombello, and is joined by a junction track to the Laveno-Mombello railway station, managed by Ferrovie dello Stato.

Services 
Laveno-Mombello is served by the regional trains operated by the lombard railway company Trenord.

See also 
 Laveno-Mombello

References

External links 

Railway stations in Lombardy
Ferrovienord stations
Railway stations opened in 1886